Embassy Theatre may refer to:


United Kingdom
 Embassy Theatre (London)
 Embassy Theatre, Peterborough

United States
 Embassy Theatre (Fort Wayne)
 Embassy Theatre (Cumberland, Maryland)
 Embassy Theatre (Lewistown, Pennsylvania)
 Embassy Theatre (New York City)

Elsewhwere
 Embassy Theatre, Wellington, New Zealand

See also
Embassy Ballroom, Adelaide, Australia (later a theatre)